Herbert Rice (5 September 1918 – 13 July 1982) was a New Zealand cricketer. He played in twelve first-class matches for Wellington and Central Districts from 1937 to 1951.

References

External links
 

1918 births
1982 deaths
New Zealand cricketers
Wellington cricketers
Central Districts cricketers
Cricketers from Wellington City
North Island cricketers